The Men's 1500 metres T37 event at the 2016 Summer Paralympics took place at the Estádio Olímpico João Havelange 11 September.

Results

T37
Competed 11 September 2016 at 16:59.

References

Athletics at the 2016 Summer Paralympics
2016 in men's athletics